Into the Moat is an American mathcore band from Fort Lauderdale, Florida. It achieved national acclaim when profiled in Alternative Press magazine in November 2003. The band signed with Metal Blade Records, which released both of their full-length albums, and completed four national tours during 2004 and 2005.

Band history
The band started in 2001 as Matthew Gossman's one-man project. He played guitar, bass guitar and drums on the first demo. In January 2002, Johannes Naranjo (since departed) joined on bass guitar and Wray moved to guitar.

Within a year, the group had recorded their first EP, Means by Which the End is Justified. Engineered by Jeremy Staska at Studio 13, the album was "discovered" by Lovelost Records after a song on the group's website drew their interest. With only an informal agreement, Lovelost Records released the EP in May 2003. The EP and subsequent brief promotional tours led the band to be signed by the metal label Metal Blade, which released their first full-length album, The Design, in March 2005. It was produced at Mana Recording Studios by Erik Rutan (Hate Eternal, Morbid Angel). Rob Shaffer left the band the same year. He is now a member of Dark Castle.

The Campaign, nearly four years in the making, was again produced and mixed by Erik Rutan at Mana Recording Studios and mastered by Alan Douches. It was released in March 2009 to positive reviews.

Into the Moat have remained silent until a 2016 interview with Sheeps X Clothing where they finally revealed that the band was, for all intents and purposes, done. This does, however, create a unique air of discussion regarding their contract with Metal Blade, which reportedly held that one record was left to be completed.

Current line up
Matthew Gossman - drums
Kit Wray - guitars
Earl Ruwell IV - vocals
Nick "The Greek" Ziros - bass

Former members
Johannes "Hon-Hon" Naranjo - bass
Josh Thiel - bass (2005)
Rob Shaffer - guitars (2005)
Steve Walbroehl - guitars (2001 - 2003)
Jose Escobar - bass
Travis LeVrier - guitars (ex-Entheos, ex-Scale the Summit)

Discography
"2 Song Demo" (2002) (self-released)
"3 Song Demo" (2003) (self-released)
Means by Which the End Is Justified (Lovelost, 2003)
The Design (Metal Blade, 2005)
The Campaign (Metal Blade, 2009)

References

Articles
 Bowar, C (No. 29). "Into the Moat: The Design". Outburn p 81.
 Burgess, Aaron (V. 19 No. 200, March 2005). "100 Bands You Need To Know In 2005: Into the Moat". Alternative Press p 114.
 Burgess, Aaron (V.19 No. 202, May 2005). "Into the Moat". Alternative Press p 144.
 Dick, Chris (August 2005). "Into the Moat-Review". Metal Maniacs p 60.
 Fletcher, Andrew (No. 18, 2005). "Into the Moat". Explicitly Intense p 10.
 Glasper, Ian (No. 130, April 2005). "Into the Moat: The Design". Terrorizer p 76.
 "Low Profile"(feature auth not ident) (No. 184, Nov 2003). "6 More to Watch: Into the Moat". Alternative Press p 28.
 Mick, S (April–May 2005). "Into the Moat". AMP, p 219.
 Szpirko, Andrew (No. 6, 2005). "Interview with Matt Gossman-Into the Moat". Violence magazine pp 22–23.

2001 establishments in Florida
Heavy metal musical groups from Florida
Musical groups established in 2001
Musical groups from Fort Lauderdale, Florida
Metal Blade Records artists
Musical quartets